Mary Kendall Browne (June 3, 1891 – August 19, 1971) was an American professional tennis player and an amateur golfer. She was born in Ventura County, California.

Biography
According to A. Wallis Myers of The Daily Telegraph and the Daily Mail, Browne was ranked in the world top 10 in 1921 (when the rankings began), 1924, and 1926, reaching a career high of world no. 3 in those rankings in 1921. Browne was included in the year-end top 10 rankings issued by the United States Lawn Tennis Association in 1913 (when the rankings began), 1914, 1921, 1924, and 1925. She was the top-ranked U.S. player in 1914. She also played golf and was runner-up at the 1924 U.S. Women's Amateur to champion Dorothy Campbell Hurd. She took part in the 1925 and 1926 editions of the Wightman Cup, an annual women's team tennis competition between the United States and Great Britain.

Afterwards, she became a coach at the University of Chicago, where she is credited with inventing the backboard for use in practice. She later transferred to the University of Washington and then Lake Erie College.

Browne was inducted into the International Tennis Hall of Fame in 1957.

Grand Slam finals

Singles (3 titles, 2 runners-up)

Doubles (6 titles, 1 runner-up)

Mixed Doubles (4 titles, 1 runner-up)

Grand Slam singles tournament timeline

1Through 1923, the French Championships were open only to French nationals.  The World Hard Court Championships (WHCC), actually played on clay in Paris or Brussels, began in 1912 and were open to all nationalities.  The results from that tournament are shown here from 1912 through 1914 and from 1920 through 1923.  The Olympics replaced the WHCC in 1924, as the Olympics were held in Paris.  Beginning in 1925, the French Championships were open to all nationalities, with the results shown here beginning with that year.

See also 
 Performance timelines for all female tennis players who reached at least one Grand Slam final

References

External links
 USGA website for the 1924 Championship
 "Between the Lines: Suzanne Lenglen and the First Pro Tour"
 

Amateur golfers
American female tennis players
American female golfers
American tennis coaches
Golfers from California
Grand Slam (tennis) champions in mixed doubles
Grand Slam (tennis) champions in women's doubles
Grand Slam (tennis) champions in women's singles
International Tennis Hall of Fame inductees
People from Ventura County, California
Professional tennis players before the Open Era
Tennis people from California
United States National champions (tennis)
Wimbledon champions (pre-Open Era)
1891 births
1971 deaths
20th-century American women